Malaya Tsilna (Keçe Çınlı) is a rural locality (a selo) in Drozhzhanovsky District of the Republic of Tatarstan, Russia, located on the Malaya Tsilna River. Population: 1,407.

Geography

Education and culture
There is a secondary school in Malaya Tsilna. It was founded in 1925 as a four-year elementary school, became a junior high school in 1931, and a secondary school in 1972.

There is also a House of Culture which can seat 350.

References

Notes

Sources

External links
Malaya Tsilna Secondary School

Rural localities in Tatarstan
Buinsky Uyezd